The Dravida Munnetra Kazhagam (DMK) is a political party based in the state of Tamil Nadu where it is currently the ruling party having a comfortable majority without coalition support and the union territory of Puducherry where it is currently the main opposition.

It is also one of the two main political parties in Tamil Nadu, along with the rival All India Anna Dravida Munnetra Kazhagam. Since the 2021 state election, it has been the ruling party of Tamil Nadu.
The DMK was founded on 17 September 1949 by the former chief minister of Tamil Nadu C. N. Annadurai (Anna) as a breakaway faction from the Dravidar Kazhagam headed by E. V. Ramasami (Periyar). DMK was headed by Annadurai as the general secretary from 1949 until his death on 4 February 1969. He also served as the chief minister of Tamil Nadu from 1967 to 1969. Under Annadurai, in 1967, DMK became the first party, other than the Indian National Congress, to win the state-level elections with a clear majority on its own in any state in India. M. Karunanidhi (Kalaignar) followed Annadurai as the first president of the party from 1969 until his death on 7 August 2018. He also served as the Chief Minister for five non-consecutive terms, in two of which he was dismissed by the Union government. After Karunanidhi's death, his son and former deputy, M. K. Stalin (Thalapathy), succeeded as the party president.

After the results of 2019 Indian general election, DMK became the third-largest party in the Lok Sabha. It currently holds 125 seats in the Tamil Nadu Legislative Assembly, and the DMK-led Secular Progressive Alliance holds 159.

History

Origins and foundation 

The DMK traces its roots to the South Indian Liberal Federation (Justice Party) founded by Dr C. Natesa Mudaliar in 1916, in the presence of P. Theagaraya Chetty, P. T. Rajan, T. M. Nair, Arcot Ramasamy Mudaliar and a few others in Victoria Public Hall Madras Presidency. The Justice Party, whose objectives included social equality and justice, came to power in the first general elections to the Madras Presidency in 1920. Communal division between Brahmins and non-Brahmin upper began in the presidency during the late-19th and early-20th century, mainly due to caste prejudices and disproportionate Brahminical representation in government jobs. The Justice Party's foundation marked the culmination of several efforts to establish an organization to represent the non-Brahmin upper castes in Madras and is seen as the start of the Dravidian movement.

Periyar E. V. Ramasamy, a popular reformist leader at that time, had joined Indian National Congress in 1919, to oppose what he considered the Brahminic leadership of the party. Periyar's participation at the Vaikom Satyagraha led him to start the Self-Respect Movement in 1926 which was rationalistic and "anti-Brahministic". He quit Congress and in 1935 he joined the Justice Party.

In the 1937 elections, the Justice Party lost and the Indian National Congress under C. Rajagopalachari (Rajaji) came to power in Madras Presidency. Rajaji's introduction of Hindi as a compulsory subject in schools led to the anti-Hindi agitations, led by Periyar and his associates.

In August 1944, Periyar created the 'Dravidar Kazhagam' out of the Justice Party and the Self-Respect Movement at the Salem Provincial Conference. The DK, conceived as a movement and not a political party, insisted on an independent nation for Dravidians called Dravida Nadu consisting of areas that were covered under the Madras Presidency.

The party at its inception retained the flag of the South Indian Liberal Federation, which had a picture of a traditional type of balance signifying the idea of equality. Its central theme was to remove the degraded status imposed on Dravidians. To communicate this, the party adopted a black flag with a red circle inside it, with the black signifying their degradation and the red denoting the intention of the movement to uplift Dravidians.

Over the years, many disagreements arose between Periyar and his followers. In 1949, several of his followers led by C. N. Annadurai decided to split from Dravidar Kazhagam, after an aged Periyar married a young woman Maniammai and appointed her to act as his successor to lead the party, superseding senior party leaders. Until then, E. V. K. Sampath, the nephew of Periyar, was considered his political heir.

The Dravidian philosophy culminated both politically and socially with DMK at the helm of administration. It was the first-ever subaltern movement in the history of sub-continent politics to have political representation from former lower-castes, and it was a marked move from generations of civic administrators from the upper-caste citizenry. This had a deep societal impact which resulted in increased political participation, which aided the representation of the emergent strata, enriched civic life, and subsequently strengthened the pluralist democracy.

C. N. Annadurai era (1949–1969)

The DMK's first foray into electoral politics, in the 1957 legislative assembly elections, was mixed. While it won 15 seats, many prominent leaders such as Annadurai and V. R. Nedunchezhiyan were defeated. It fared somewhat better in 1962, winning 50 seats and becoming the main opposition.

Anti-Hindi Imposition agitations 

The DMK, which split from the Dravidar Kazhagam in 1949, inherited the anti-Hindi Imposition policies of its parent organization. Founder C.N. Annadurai had earlier participated in the anti-Hindi imposition agitations during 1938–40 and throughout the 1940s.

In July 1953, the DMK launched an agitation against the Union government's proposed name-change of Kallakudi to Dalmiapuram. They claimed that the town's proposed new name (after Ramkrishna Dalmia) symbolized the exploitation of South India by the North. On 15 July, M. Karunanidhi (later Chief Minister of Tamil Nadu) and other DMK members removed the Hindi name from Dalmiapuram railway station's name board and protested on the tracks. In the altercation with the police that followed the protests, two DMK members lost their lives, and several others, including Karunanidhi and Kannadasan, were arrested.

The DMK continued its anti-Hindi Imposition policies throughout the 1950s, along with the secessionist demand for Dravida Nadu, in which it was originally more radical than the Dravida Kazhagam. On 28 January 1956, Annadurai, along with Periyar and Rajaji, signed a resolution passed by the Academy of Tamil Culture endorsing the continuation of English as the official language. On 21 September 1957, the DMK convened an anti-Hindi Conference to protest against the imposition of Hindi. It observed 13 October 1957 as "anti-Hindi Day".

On 31 July 1960, another open air anti-Hindi conference was held in Kodambakkam, Madras. In November 1963, DMK dropped its secessionist demand in the wake of the Sino-Indian War and the passage of the anti-secessionist 16th Amendment to the Indian Constitution. However, the anti-Hindi stance remained and hardened with the passage of Official Languages Act of 1963. The DMK's view on Hindi's eligibility for official language status were reflected in Annadurai's response to the "numerical superiority of Hindi" argument: "If we had to accept the principle of numerical superiority while selecting our national bird, the choice would have fallen not on the peacock but on the common crow."

Formation of state government 
In 1967, DMK came to power in the Madras State 18 years after its formation and 10 years after it had first entered electoral politics. This began the Dravidian era in the Madras province, which later became Tamil Nadu. In 1967, the Congress lost nine states to opposition parties, but it was only in Madras that a single non-Congress Party (namely, the DMK) won a majority. The electoral victory of 1967 is also reputed to be an electoral fusion among the non-Congress parties to avoid a split in the Opposition votes. Rajagopalachari, a former senior leader of the Congress Party, had by then left the Congress and launched the right-wing Swatantra Party. He played a vital role in bringing about the electoral fusion amongst the opposition parties to align against the Congress. At that time, his cabinet was the youngest in the country.

Other achievements 
Annadurai legalised self-respect marriages for the first time the country. Such marriages did not involve priests presiding over the ceremonies, and thus a Brahmin was not needed to carry out the wedding. Self-respect marriages were a brainchild of Periyar, who regarded the then conventional marriages as mere financial arrangements which often led to great debt through dowry. Self-respect marriages, according to him, encouraged inter-caste marriages and caused arranged marriages to be replaced by love marriages.

Annadurai was also the first to promise to subsidize the price of rice in order to campaign for his election. He promised one rupee a measure of rice, which he initially implemented once in government, but had to withdraw later. Subsidising rice costs are still used as an election promise in Tamil Nadu.

It was Annadurai's government that renamed Madras State to Tamil Nadu, its present day name. The name change itself was first presented in the upper house (Rajya Sabha) of the Parliament of India by Bhupesh Gupta, a communist MP from West Bengal, but was then defeated. With Annadurai as chief minister, the state assembly succeeded in passing the bill renaming the state. Another major achievement of Annadurai's government was to introduce a two language policy over the then popular three language formula. The three language formula, which was implemented in the neighbouring states of Karnataka, Andhra Pradesh and Kerala, entitled students to study three languages: the regional language, English and Hindi.

Karunanidhi's leadership (1969–2018) 

In 1969, Annadurai unexpectedly died. M. Karunanidhi was elected as his successor, defeating rival candidate V. R. Nedunchezhiyan. Karunanidhi would continue to head the DMK until his own death in 2018.

In the 1970s, M. G. Ramachandran (M.G.R.), a popular actor and the party treasurer, resulting in a political feud between M.G.R. and the party president Karunanidhi. In 1972, M.G.R. called for a boycott of the party's General Council. The crisis led to a call for a corruption probe by M.G.R. where he was a treasurer, and he was eventually suspended from the General Council by the high power committee of DMK. He then created the new party named All India Anna Dravida Munnetra Kazhagam (AIADMK).

Indira Gandhi dismissed the Karunanidhi government in 1976 based on charges of possible secession and corruption. The DMK government has been indicted by the Sarkaria commission for corruption in allotting tenders for the Veeranam drainage project.

The interim report of the Justice Jain Commission, which oversaw the investigation into Rajiv Gandhi's assassination, indicted Karunanidhi for abetting the Liberation Tigers of Tamil Eelam (LTTE). The interim report recommended that Tamil Nadu Chief Minister M. Karunanidhi and the DMK party be held responsible for abetting Rajiv Gandhi's murderers. The final report contained no such allegations.

Karunanidhi's nephew, Murasoli Maran, was a Union Minister; however, it has been pointed out that he was in politics long before Karunanidhi became the Chief Minister in 1969. Many political opponents and DMK party senior leaders have been critical of the rise of M. K. Stalin in the party. He was appointed as Mayor and later as Deputy CM of TN. But some of the party men have pointed out that Stalin has come up on his own. Karunanidhi's daughter Kanimozhi has been appointed as the Rajya Sabha MP twice in 2007 and 2013. Karunanidhi's nephew's son Dayanidhi Maran has been appointed as the central Minister. Karunanidhi's grandson, son of Stalin Udhayanidhi Stalin, has been elected as the MLA of TN assembly. Karunanidhi has been accused of helping Murasoli Maran's son Kalanithi Maran, who runs Sun TV Network, India's second largest television network. According to Forbes, Kalanidhi is among India's richest 20, with $2.9 billion. It has been pointed out that Karunanidhi has hesitated to take action against his erring family members. Karunanidhi is also accused of allowing Azhagiri to function as an extraconstitutional authority in Madurai. The Dinakaran newspaper case was handed over to the CBI. But the District and Sessions court acquitted all the 17 accused in that case.

Elections under Karunanidhi's presidency 
 In 1977, DMK lost the Assembly elections to M.G.R.'s AIADMK, and stayed out of power in the state till 1989. After MGR's death in December 1987, AIADMK split into two factions between Janaki (MGR's wife) and Jayalalithaa. DMK returned to power in the 1989 State assembly elections and 3rd time Chief Minister Tamil Nadu Karunanidhi took over as chief minister in January 1989.
 The 1991 election was held with the backdrop of DMK government having dissolved within 2 years of formation due to pressure from ex-Prime Minister Rajiv Gandhi leading an alliance with Samajwadi Janata Party. In the same year Rajiv Gandhi was killed by a suicide bomber during the election campaign, and due to DMK's pro-Tamil stance and the dismissal of the state government mid-campaign by Rajiv, attitudes were against DMK and instead in favor of the AIADMK–Congress alliance, causing the DMK to be deprived of any seats in the Parliament.
 In the 1996 state elections, DMK came to power on strength of corruption charges against J.Jayalalithaa and the alliance with Tamil Maanila Congress (TMC), headed by G.K. Moopanar.
However, in 2001, the AIADMK, on strength of a strong alliance and the incumbency factor against DMK, came back to power in the state assembly elections.
 In the 2004 parliamentary elections, DMK formed an alliance with Congress, the Marumalarchi Dravida Munnetra Kazhagam (MDMK) and the Pattali Makkal Katchi (PMK) and swept a grand victory. The alliance won all 40 seats including Puducherry. This enabled DMK to hold 7 ministerial posts in the central government and gave influential power to DMK.
 Two years later in 2006, the same alliance won in the state assembly elections and the DMK, for the first time, formed a minority government in the state with help from Congress. M Karunanidhi became the Chief Minister of the state for the fifth time. The DMK-Congress alliance was also successful in the 2009 parliamentary elections.
 In the 2011 Assembly elections, held in the wake of the 2G case and allegations of nepotism, the DMK won only 23 seats, 127 seats less than earlier.
 In the 2014 Lok Sabha election DMK failed to win any seats; however, by vote percentage, it was second only to AIADMK.
 The 2016 state assembly elections gave DMK 89 MLAs. This was the most number for an opposition party in the history of the Tamil Nadu legislative assembly.

M. K. Stalin’s leadership  (2018–present) 

Karunanidhi died on 7 August 2018, leaving the party in the hands of his son, M. K. Stalin. Stalin had been appointed as the working president in January 2017 when his father's health started declining, and had previously been named heir apparent by his father. Stalin thus became the second DMK president since the party's inception. On 3 February 2020, M. K. Stalin announced that Prashant Kishor was signed up as a party strategist for the upcoming 2021 Tamil Nadu Legislative Assembly election.

On 25 March 2018, the DMK held a statewide conference in Erode and M. K. Stalin released five slogans at the conference. They were:

 Let us keep an eye on the Kalaignar's command
 Let us grow and admire Tamil
 Let us crush the power pile
 Let us protect humanity from extremism
 Let us grow a prosperous Tamil Nadu
M.K. Stalin formed the Secular Progressive Alliance in Tamil Nadu and led the alliance in the 2019 general election. M.K. Stalin and his alliance in Tamil Nadu won 39 out of 40 seats in the parliament and 12 out of 21 in the Assembly with a 52% vote share. The DMK-led alliance won the 2019 Tamil Nadu local body elections under the Secular Progressive alliance.

The DMK-led Secular Progressive Alliance won the 2021 Tamil Nadu Legislative Assembly election. The alliance won 159 seats out of 234 seats with 46% vote share.

Party ideology

Dravidian nationalism 
The Anti-Hindi Imposition agitations of 1965 forced the central government to abandon its efforts to use Hindi as the only official language of the country. However, Hindi usage has continued as Indian government employees are asked to write as much as 65% of the letters and memoranda in Hindi.

State autonomy 
After The Emergency invoked by Indira Gandhi, more state powers like education and medical care were moved from state control to national control. At the state conference in Trichy after the death of C.N. Annadurai, M. Karunanidhi announced the adoption of the "state autonomy" principle to advocate for state self-governance. In April 1974, the DMK government brought in a resolution in the House urging the centre to accept the Rajamannar Committee recommendations on state autonomy and amend the Constitution of India to pave the way for a truly federal system.

Social justice 
The DMK reconstituted the disabled persons welfare board to Differently Abled Persons Departments and the changed official terms for transgender individuals to more respectful terms like Thirunangai and Thirunambi.

Party symbol 
The party's election symbol is the "sun rising from between two mountains", with a black and red flag often pictured. The symbol was inspired by the leader and scriptwriter M. Karunanidhi's 1950s play Udaya Suryan, and is intended to signify the "rising" spirit of the Dravidian people.

In the 1957 poll, the DMK was not recognized by the Election Commission. The party was grouped as independents and was not united by its rising sun symbol and was forced to contest under the rooster symbol.

Electoral history

Parliament General elections in Tamil Nadu

Legislative Assembly elections

Current office bearers and prominent members

Party Leadership 
Presidents

General Secretaries

List of chief ministers

Madras State

Pondicherry 
1. M. O. H. Farook: 17 March 1969 – 2 January 1974 (1752 days)
2. M. D. R. Ramachandran: 16 January 1980 – 23 June 1983; 8 March 1990 – 2 March 1991 (1613 days)
3. R. V. Janakiraman: 26 May 1996 – 21 March 2000 (1395 days)

Tamil Nadu 
1. C. N. Annadurai: 14 January 1969 – 3 February 1969 (20 days)
2. V. R. Nedunchezhiyan: 3 February 1969 – 10 February 1969 (7 days)
3. M. Karunanidhi: 10 February 1969 – 31 January 1976; 27 January 1989 – 30 January 1991; 13 May 1996 – 13 May 2001; 13 May 2006 – 15 May 2011 (6863 days)
4. M. K. Stalin: 7 May 2021 – Incumbent ( days)

List of deputy chief ministers

Tamil Nadu 
1. M. K. Stalin: 29 May 2009 – 15 May 2011 (716 days)

List of leaders of the opposition

Pondicherry Legislative Assembly 
1. R. V. Janakiraman: 22 March 2000 – 15 May 2001; 24 May 2001 – 11 May 2006 (2232 days)
2. A. M. H. Nazeem: 29 May 2006 – 20 September 2006 (114 days)

Puducherry Legislative Assembly 
1. A. M. H. Nazeem: 20 September 2006 – 14 May 2011 (1697 days)
2. R. Siva: 8 May 2021 – Incumbent ( days)

Tamil Nadu Legislative Assembly 
1. V. R. Nedunchezhiyan: 29 March 1962 – 28 February 1967 (1797 days)
2. M. Karunanidhi: 25 July 1977 – 17 February 1980; 27 June 1980 – 18 August 1983 (2084 days)
3. K. Anbazhagan: 24 May 2001 – 14 April 2006 (1786 days)
4. M. K. Stalin: 4 June 2016 – 3 May 2021 (1794 days)

Speakers of the Tamil Nadu Legislative Assembly

List of union ministers

Splits and offshoots 
There are two major parties that have been formed as a result of splits from the DMK, such as
 All India Anna Dravida Munnetra Kazhagam (AIADMK), founded on 17 October 1972 by the former Chief Minister of Tamil Nadu M. G. Ramachandran (M.G.R.).
 Marumalarchi Dravida Munnetra Kazhagam (MDMK), founded on 6 May 1994 by Member of Parliament, Rajya Sabha Vaiko.

Media 

Dravida Munnetra Kazhagam party runs two newspapers, one in English and one in Tamil, namely The Rising Sun (weekly journal) and Murasoli (daily journal), respectively.

Kalaignar TV is a channel started on 15 September 2007 and managed by Kanimozhi Karunanidhi and Dayalu Ammal, the daughter and wife of Karunanidhi. The sister channels of Kalaignar are Kalaignar Isai Aruvi (24×7 Tamil music channel), Kalaignar Seithigal (24×7 Tamil news channel), Kalaignar Sirippoli (24×7 Tamil comedy channel), Kalaignar Chithiram (24×7 Tamil cartoon channel), Kalaignar Murasu(24×7 Tamil movie channel) and Kalaignar Asia.

See also
 2G spectrum case
 Granite scam in Tamil Nadu
 Controversy of arrests in Tamil Nadu about construction of flyovers
 Dinakaran attack
 Leelavathi murder
 Kallakudi demonstration
 Assassination of Rajiv Gandhi
 Politics of India
 List of political parties in India

References

Publications

External links
  
 Dravida Munnetra Kazhagam — entry at Encyclopædia Britannica

 
1949 establishments in India
Dravidian political parties
Political parties established in 1949
Regionalist parties in India
Social democratic parties in Asia
State political parties in Puducherry
State political parties in Tamil Nadu